The Hajibeyov Baku Academy of Music  (Azeri: Hacıbəyov adına Bakı Musiqi Akademiyası) is a  music school in Baku, Azerbaijan. It was established in 1920 in Baku and was previously known as the Hajibeyov Azerbaijan State Conservatoire.

History
In 1920, Azerbaijani composer Uzeyir Hajibeyov began a movement aimed at propagating classical music among the people. His report presented at the Azerbaijani People's Commissariat of Education (early Soviet analogue of a Ministry of Education) offering the establishment of a high-level music education institution resulted in the approval of his proposal. Thus, the Azerbaijan State Conservatoire was founded on 25 May 1920. Hajibeyov became one of its first instructors. In the 1920s, he established the Oriental Department, where Azeri folk music was taught both traditionally (orally) and by European methods, i.e., using notes. Along with composer Muslim Magomayev, he developed the textbook Azeri Folk Songs published in 1927. In 1939, Hajibeyov was made head of the Conservatoire.

In 1930, the Saint Thaddeus and Bartholomew Armenian Cathedral of Baku was demolished as part of the early Soviet atheist policy to make way for the construction of the new academy building.

During World War II, the conservatoire executives organized hundreds of concerts for military units and soldiers who recovered in hospitals. It was enhanced with the Bulbul Specialized Secondary Music School in 1931, the Music Studio School in 1980, and the Mammadova Opera Studio in 1984.

In 1991, it was renamed Hajibeyov Baku Academy of Music.

Academics
There are three faculties and 18 departments. The academy offers graduating students master's, kandidat's, and doctorate degrees. There are two research laboratories — the Restoration and Improvement of Ancient Musical Instruments Laboratory established in 1991 and the Investigation of Professional Oral Music Traditions Laboratory, established in 1992.

Notable staff and alumni
Gara Garayev
Fikrat Amirov
Soltan Hajibeyov
Jovdat Hajiyev
Arif Melikov
Khayyam Mirzazadeh
Sona Aslanova
Polad Bülbüloğlu
Tofig Guliyev
Ismayil Hajibeyov
Vagif Mustafazade
Muslim Magomayev
Ödön Pártos
Kovkab Safaraliyeva
Vladimir Shainsky
Asaf Zeynalli
Dilara Kazimova
Javid Samadov
Yusif Akhundzade
Fidan Aghayeva-Edler
Emin Sabitoglu
Aliya Teregulova
 Tatiana Sheinin
 Aida Huseynova

References

External links
Baku Musical Academy website 

 
Music schools in Azerbaijan
Music venues in Azerbaijan
Educational institutions established in 1920
1920 establishments in Azerbaijan
Stalinist architecture
Universities and institutes established in the Soviet Union